Americanization or Americanisation (see spelling differences) is the influence of American culture and business on other countries outside the United States of America, including their media, cuisine, business practices, popular culture, technology or political techniques. Some observers have described Americanization as synonymous with progress and innovation. However, it is also used as a pejorative term by critics who oppose American influences.

Hollywood, the American film and television industry, has since the 1920s dominated most of the world's media markets. It is the chief medium by which people across the globe see American fashions, customs, scenery, and way of life. The top 50 highest-grossing films of all time were all made entirely or partially in the United States.

Coca-Cola, previously the top global company by revenue, is often viewed as a symbol of Americanization, giving rise to the term "Coca-Cola diplomacy" for anything emblematic of US soft power. Fast food is also often viewed as being a symbol of US marketing dominance. Companies such as McDonald's, Burger King, Pizza Hut, Kentucky Fried Chicken and Domino's Pizza among others have numerous outlets around the world. Of the top ten global brands (2017) by revenue, seven are based in the United States: Apple Inc., Google, Microsoft, Coca-Cola, Amazon, Facebook and IBM.

During the Cold War, Americanization was the method to counter the processes of Sovietization around the world. Education, schools, and particularly universities became the main target for Americanization. However, resistance to Americanization of the university community restrained it, although it was still much more successful than Sovietization. Americanization has become more prevalent since the end of the Soviet Union in 1991 and especially since the advent of widespread high speed Internet use in the mid-2000s.

Criticism of Americanization has included opposition to US investments in Europe during the 1960s, which subsided by the 1970s. A new dimension of anti-Americanism is fear of the pervasiveness of American Internet technology.

Definitions

Like many concepts in social sciences, the term has been called ambiguous, however, a rough consensus on its meaning exists. Harm G. Schröter who focused on the economic dimension of the process, defined it as "an adapted transfer of values, behaviours, institutions, technologies, patterns of organization, symbols and norms from the USA to the economic life of other states". Mel van Elteren defined this in a broader way, as "a process in which economic, technological, political, social, cultural and/or socio–psychological influences emanating from America or Americans impinge on values, norms, belief systems, mentalities, habits, rules, technologies, practices, institutions and behaviors of non-Americans".

Media and popular culture
 
Hollywood, the American film and television industry, has since the 1920s dominated most of the world's media markets. It is the chief medium by which people across the globe see American fashions, customs, scenery, and way of life.

In general, the US government plays only a facilitating role in the dissemination of films, television, books, journals and so on. However, after the occupation of the former Axis countries of World War II, the US government played a major role in restructuring the media in those countries to eliminate totalitarianism and to promote democracy against fascism and Nazism. For example, in Germany, the American occupation headquarters, Office of Military Government, United States (OMGUS) in 1945 began its own newspaper based in Munich.  was edited by German and Jewish émigrés who had fled to the United States before the war. Its mission was to destroy Nazi cultural remnants and encourage democracy by exposing Germans to how American culture operated. There was great detail on sports, politics, business, Hollywood, fashions, and international affairs. Americanization would continue to spread out over the Iron Curtain even before the end of the Soviet Union and periodically afterward.

Foreign versions of American television programs are rebroadcast around the world, many of them through American broadcasters and their subsidiaries (such as HBO Asia, CNBC Europe and CNN International). Many of the distributors broadcast mainly American programming on their television channels. In 2006, a survey of 20 countries by Radio Times found seven American shows in the ten most watched: CSI: Miami, Lost, Desperate Housewives, The Simpsons, CSI: Crime Scene Investigation, Without a Trace and The Adventures of Jimmy Neutron: Boy Genius.

American films are also extremely popular around the world and often dominate cinemas as a result of a high demand of US product exported to consumers to clear away the outlook of World War II. The top 50 highest-grossing films of all time were all made entirely or partially in the United States. Often, part of the negotiating in free trade agreements between the US and other nations involves screen quotas. One such case is Mexico, which abolished screen quotas after the establishment of the North American Free Trade Agreement (NAFTA) with the US and Canada. South Korea has agreed to reduce its quota under pressure from the US as part of a free trade deal.

Many American musicians, such as Elvis Presley and Michael Jackson, are internationally known and have sold over 500 million albums each. Michael Jackson's album Thriller, at 100 million sales, is the best-selling album of all time.

By the study of vocabulary and spelling of English words in books and tweets, American English is more common in communities in the European Union than British English. This trend is more apparent in the events after World War II and the end of the Soviet Union.

Business and brands

Of the top ten global brands (2017) by revenue, seven are based in the United States: Apple Inc., Google, Microsoft, Coca-Cola, Amazon (company), Facebook and IBM. Coca-Cola, which previously held the top spot, is often viewed as a symbol of Americanization, giving rise to the term "Coca-Cola diplomacy" for anything emblematic of US soft power. Fast food is also often viewed as being a symbol of US marketing dominance. Companies such as McDonald's, Burger King, Pizza Hut, Kentucky Fried Chicken and Domino's Pizza among others have numerous outlets around the world.

Many of the world's biggest computer companies are also U.S.-based, such as Microsoft, Apple, Intel, HP Inc., Dell and IBM, and much of the software bought worldwide is created by US-based companies. Carayannis and Campbell note, "The USA occupies, also in global terms, a very strong position in the software sector."

By 1900, some observers saw "Americanization" as synonymous with progress and innovation. In Germany during the 1920s, the American efficiency movement was called "rationalization" and was a powerful social and economic force. In part, it looked explicitly at American models, especially Fordism. "Rationalization" meant higher productivity and greater efficiency and promised that science would bring prosperity. More generally, it promised a new level of modernity and was applied to economic production and consumption as well as public administration. Various versions of rationalization were promoted by industrialists and social democrats, by engineers and architects, by educators and academics, by middle-class feminists and social workers, by government officials and politicians of many parties. As ideology and practice, rationalization challenged and transformed not only machines, factories, and vast business enterprises but also the lives of middle-class and working-class Germans.

Department stores threatened the more local businesses, with low prices and chain-managed stores. The small businesses were determined and fought back to protect their source of income from the US market.

During the Cold War, Americanization was the method to counter the processes of Sovietization around the world. Education, schools, and particularly universities became the main target for Americanization. However, resistance to Americanization of the university community restrained it, although it was still much more successful than Sovietization.

Visibility

From 1950 to 1965, American investments in Europe soared by 800% to $13.9 billion and in the European Economic Community rose ten times to $6.25 billion. Europe's share of American investments increased from 15% to 28%. The investments were of very high visibility and generated much talk of Americanization. Even so, American investments in Europe represented only 50% of the total European investment and American-owned companies in the European Economic Community employ only 2 or 3% of the total labor force. The basic reason for US investments is no longer lower production costs, faster economic growth, or higher profits in Europe but the desire to maintain a competitive position based largely on American technological superiority. Opposition to US investments was originally confined to France but later spread to other European countries. Public opinion began to resent American advertising and business methods, personnel policies, and the use of the English language by American companies. Criticism was also directed toward the international currency system which was blamed for inflationary tendencies as a result of the dominant position of the US dollars.  However, by the 1970s, European investments in the US had increased even more rapidly than vice versa, and Geir Lundestad finds there was less talk of the Americans buying Europe.

Recent trends
Americanization has become more prevalent since the collapse of the Soviet Union in 1991. Until the late 1980s, the communist press could be counted on to be especially critical of the United States. To some extent, Russia continued that role under Vladimir Putin, and there are similar tendencies in China. Putin in 2013 published an opinion article in The New York Times that attacked the American tendency to see itself as an exceptional indispensable nation. "It is extremely dangerous," Putin warned, "to encourage people to see themselves as exceptional, whatever the motivation."

A new dimension of anti-Americanism is fear of the pervasiveness of American Internet technology. Americanization has arrived through widespread high-speed Internet and smartphone technology since 2008, with a large fraction of the new apps and hardware being designed in Silicon Valley. In Europe, there is growing concern about excess Americanization through Google, Facebook, Twitter, the iPhone and Uber, among many other American Internet-based corporations. European governments have increasingly expressed concern about privacy issues, as well as antitrust and taxation issues regarding the new American giants. There is a fear that they are significantly evading taxes, and posting information that may violate European privacy laws. The Wall Street Journal in 2015 reported "deep concerns in Europe's highest policy circles about the power of U.S. technology companies."

Historiography
In 1902 the British journalist William Stead used this term in the title of his book, The Americanization of the World, in which he discussed the growing popularity of the "American ideas".

Berghahn (2010) analyzes the debate on the usefulness of the concepts of 'Americanization' and 'Westernization'. He reviews the recent research on the European–American relationship during the Cold War that has dealt with the cultural influence of the United States upon Europe. He then discusses the relevant work on this subject in the fields of economic and business history. Overall, the article tries to show that those who have applied the concept of 'Americanization' to their research on cultural or economic history have been well aware of the complexities of trans-Atlantic relations in this period, whether they were viewed as a two-way exchange or as a process of circulation.

The Americanization of the Navajo at Canyon de Chelly was carried out by the Bureau of Indian Affairs in the late 1800s.

Criticism
Some critics believe that the result of the rivalry between Sinicization and Americanization may lead to the emergence of a third power or turn one of the two into the actor with the most bargaining power. In the midst of this competition, the interests and rights of local businesses may be violated.

Some other critics believe that Americanization is a new method of colonialism in the age of global consumerism; a colonialism that uses deception instead of force.

See also

References

Further reading
 Abdulrahim, Masoud A., Ali A. J. Al-Kandari, and Mohammed Hasanen, “The Influence of American Television Programs on University Students in Kuwait: A Synthesis,” European Journal of American Culture 28 (no. 1, 2009), 57–74.
 Andrew Anglophone (Ed.), "Californication and Cultural Imperialism: Baywatch and the Creation of World Culture", 1997, Point Sur: Malibu University Press, .
 Campbell, Neil, Jude Davies and George McKay, eds. Issues in Americanisation and Culture. Edinburgh: Edinburgh University Press, 2004.
 DeBres, Karen. "A Cultural Geography of McDonald's UK," Journal of Cultural Geography, 2005
 Fehrenbach, Heide, and Uta G. Poiger. "Americanization Reconsidered," in idem, eds., Transactions, Transgressions, Transformations: American Culture in Western Europe and Japan (2000)
 Glancy, Mark. Hollywood and the Americanization of Britain, from the 1920s to the present (I.B. Tauris, 2013), 340 pages, 
 Glancy, Mark. "Temporary American citizens? British audiences, Hollywood films and the threat of Americanization in the 1920s." Historical Journal of Film, Radio and Television (2006) 26#4 pp. 461–84.
 Gräser, Marcus Model America, EGO - European History Online, Mainz: Institute of European History, 2011, retrieved: March 8, 2021.
 Haines, Gerald K. The Americanization of Brazil: A Study of U.S.Cold War Diplomacy in the Third World, 1945–54, Scholarly Resources, 1993
 Hendershot, Robert M. Family Spats: Perception, Illusion, and Sentimentality in the Anglo-American Special Relationship (2008)
 Hilger, Susanne: The Americanisation of the European Economy after 1880, European History Online, Mainz: Institute of European History, 2012, retrieved: June 6, 2012.
 Kroes, Rob. "American empire and cultural imperialism: A view from the receiving end." Diplomatic History 23.3 (1999): 463-477 online.
 Martn, Lawrence. Pledge of Allegiance: The Americanization of Canada in the Mulroney Years, Mcclelland & Stewart Ltd, 1993, 
 Malchow, H.L. Special Relations: The Americanization of Britain? (Stanford University Press; 2011) 400 pages; explores American influence on the culture and counterculture of metropolitan London from the 1950s to the 1970s, from "Swinging London" to black, feminist, and gay liberation. excerpt and text search
 Moffett, Samuel E. The Americanization of Canada (1907) full text online
 Nolan, Mary.  Visions of Modernity: American Business and the Modernization of Germany (1995)
 Nolan, Mary. "Housework Made Easy: the Taylorized Housewife in Weimar Germany's Rationalized Economy," Feminist Studies. Volume: 16. Issue: 3. pp. 549+
 Pells, Richard. Not like Us: How Europeans Have Loved, Hated and Transformed American Culture since World War II (1997) online
 Reynolds, David. Rich relations: the American occupation of Britain, 1942-1945 (1995)
Rydell, Robert W., Rob Kroes: Buffalo Bill in Bologna. The Americanization of the World, 1869–1922, University of Chicago Press, 2005, 
 Willett, Ralph. The Americanization of Germany, 1945–1949 (1989)
 Zenklusen, Stefan: A Look Back at a Quarter Century of Globalization - Verifying the Thesis of Anglo-Americanization, Göttingen 2020,

Historiography
 Berghahn, Volker R. "The debate on 'Americanization' among economic and cultural historians," Cold War History, Feb 2010, 10#1, pp. 107–30
 Kuisel, Richard F. "The End of Americanization? or Reinventing a Research Field for Historians of Europe" Journal of Modern History 92#3 (Sept  2020) pp 602–634 online.

Cultural assimilation
American culture
Western culture